Edgar Alfred Jepson (28 November 1863 – 12 April 1938) was an English author. He largely wrote mainstream adventure and detective fiction, but also supernatural and fantasy stories. He sometimes used the pseudonym R. Edison Page.

Early life
Edgar Jepson was born on 28 November 1863 in Bloomsbury, London, but grew up in Kenilworth, Warwickshire, the second of five sons and three daughters raised by Alfred and Margaret Jepson (née Hutcheon). Jepson's father, a dentist, originally hailed from Gainsborough, Lincolnshire, while his mother was a Londoner (St Pancras). Jepson attended Leamington College for Boys (today North Leamington School) and graduated from Balliol College, Oxford. After his education, he spent some years in Barbados, before taking up residence in the King's Bench Walk area of London, where he began his literary career.

Career
As an author, Jepson used a pseudonym, R. Edison Page, for some of his short stories. In other works he collaborated with such authors as John Gawsworth, Arthur Machen and Hugh Clevely. Jepson was also a translator, notably of the Arsène Lupin stories of Maurice Leblanc. He was a member of the Square Club (from 1908) of established Edwardian authors, and one of the more senior members of the New Bohemians drinking club. He was a good friend of the author Ford Madox Ford.

Jepson edited Vanity Fair magazine for a short period, during which he employed Richard Barham Middleton. Jepson did much to preserve Middleton's memory after his death.

Two of Jepson's children became writers. His son Selwyn Jepson was a crime writer, while his daughter, Margaret (married name Birkinshaw), published novels as Margaret Jepson, including Via Panama (1934). Margaret's younger daughter is the novelist Fay Weldon.

Edgar Jepson died on 12 April 1938 at his home in Hampstead. He was survived by his son and both daughters and by his former wife Frita Bisham Holmes, daughter of the violinist and composer Henry Holmes.

Works

References

External links

Edgar Jepson's Garden
The Tea Leaf, Jepson's best-known short story

1863 births
1938 deaths
19th-century English novelists
20th-century English novelists
English fantasy writers
English children's writers
Vanity Fair (British magazine) people
English male short story writers
English male novelists
19th-century British short story writers
19th-century English male writers
20th-century British short story writers
20th-century English male writers